Abergwesyn is a village in the Welsh county of Powys, in mid-Wales, at the start of the Abergwesyn valley and at the confluence of the Afon Irfon and the Afon Gwesyn.

Abergwesyn Commons stretch between the Nant Irfon valley and Llanwrthwl. They are rich in archaeology, including Bronze Age ritual sites and deserted medieval villages. A National Trust project is focused on the preservation of the peatland.

Abergwesyn Commons

There are many cairns and other evidence of ancient human activity. To the north the ground falls away to the edge of the Elan Valley Reservoirs. The summit ridge is wild and bleak with expansive views across the roof of Wales. Among the wildlife to be seen are red grouse, northern lapwing and red kite.

National Trust
The National Trust has an ongoing ecology project, centred on the preservation of peatland in the  Abergwesyn Commons. The site has extensive areas of deep peat and blanket bog in poor condition due to past overgrazing and burning. The work done has benefited the golden plover, an amber-listed species on the Birds of Conservation Concern index.

Church and chapel 
Formerly a chapel of ease to Llangamarch, St David's became a parish church, last used in 1865. There are remains of a building, nowhere reaching above  in 1977. This is set within the remains of a churchyard  and associated with Ffynnon Ddewi.

In 1740 the curate in the parishes of Llanwrtyd, Llanfihangel Abergwesyn and Llanddewi Abergwesyn, was Wales' most famous hymn-writer William Williams Pantycelyn. Llanddewi Abergwesyn parish was united with Llanfihangel Abergwesyn parish in 1885, and separate marriage registers were not kept thereafter. Parish registers are held, at the National Library of Wales and/or Powys Archives for baptisms 1813–1984, marriages 1813–1873, burials 1813-1986 and banns 1826-1862 and 1957–1959. Also, at Cardiff Central Library and NLW, are records of baptisms 1738–1812, marriages 1738-56 and 1765–1812, and burials 1738–1812. Bishops' Transcripts, for various periods, are also held at NLW.

Moriah Welsh Independent Chapel was built in 1828 and rebuilt in 1867. It is built of whitewashed stone, in the Vernacular style with a gable entry plan and flat headed windows. It has a later porch entrance through one gable with a later nineteenth-century platform pulpit set beyond the pews. There is a lean-to store and/or stable down one side and the pulpit end and other side elevation have two rectangular sash-windows each with late-nineteenth century coloured border glazing. There is a flat plain boarded ceiling and memorial tablets on the walls. The chapel was still in use in 2001, but had closed by 2010.

Other Landmarks

ROC Bunker 
The village was the location for a small Royal Observer Corps Monitoring Bunker between 1961 and 1968, It remains mostly intact.

See also
Desert of Wales

References

External links 

Photos of Abergwesyn and surrounding area on geograph
 

Villages in Powys
Scenic routes in the United Kingdom
Llanwrtyd Wells